Viktoria Igorevna Kulishova (born 12 August 1999) is a Russian ice hockey player and member of the Russian national team, currently playing in the Zhenskaya Hockey League (ZhHL) with SKIF Nizhny Novgorod.

She participated in the women‘s ice hockey tournament at the 2018 Winter Olympics with the Olympic Athletes from Russia team, represented Russia at the 2019 IIHF Women's World Championship and 2019 Winter Universiade, and represented the Russian Olympic Committee (ROC) at the 2021 IIHF Women's World Championship.

References

External links
 
 

1999 births
Living people
People from Megion
Russian women's ice hockey forwards
HC SKIF players
Ice hockey players at the 2018 Winter Olympics
Ice hockey players at the 2022 Winter Olympics
Olympic ice hockey players of Russia
Competitors at the 2019 Winter Universiade
Universiade medalists in ice hockey
Universiade gold medalists for Russia
Sportspeople from Khanty-Mansi Autonomous Okrug